Burton upon Trent has a long history of brewing, at one time exporting beer throughout the world and accounting for a quarter of UK beer production; emulation of Burton water in brewing is called Burtonisation. Much of the town was given over to the industry throughout the 19th century and brewers dominated it politically and socially.

Brewers and brewing companies
Some brewers had more than one brewery and brewery buildings sometimes changed hands.  In addition to companies started from scratch, there were also pre-existing brewers from outside Burton who moved into the town in the 1870s.

Benjamin Printon 1708 - bought by James Musgrave 1729
James Musgrave (and sons) 1729 - bought by John Greaves 1803
Samuel and William Sketchley c1741-  bought by Benjamin Wilson 1790
Benjamin Wilson 1743- bought by nephew Samuel Allsopp 1807
Joseph Clay c1751- passed to Thomas Salt 1813
Charles Leeson c1753-1800
William Worthington 1760- bought by Bass 1927
Thomas Morecroft 
Thomas Dicken
William Bass 1777- bought by Coors 2000
Henry Evans 1790 - settled on son-in-law William Worthington
John Walker Wilson -1790
Hill and Sherratts c1780 –partnership dissolved 1820, bought by Lewis Meakin 1822
John Greaves 1803- went bankrupt 1815 – run by Mason and Gilbertson by 1830
Samuel Allsopp 1807- merged with Ind Coope 1934
Thomas Salt 1813- acquired by Bass 1927
Lewis Meakin 1822- acquired by Charrington 1872
Charles Hill - the Hill of Hill and Sherratt - in 1874 Charles Hill and son
Mason and Gilbertson 1830-
John Marston 1834- merged with Thompson 1898
Saunders 1837-
Burton Brewery Company 1842- bought by Worthington 1915
Ind Coope 1856 -  went into receivership in 1909 and merged with Allsopp in 1934
Charrington (Head & Co) existing London brewer 1872 -  ceased brewing in Burton 1926
Truman, Hanbury, Buxton & Co existing London brewer 1873-1971
Mann, Crossman & Paulin existing London brewer 1874 - merged with Watney 1958
Peter Walker 1876- acquired by Bass 1923
Sydney Evershed pre 1880 - merged with Marston Thompson 1909
John Thompson pre 1880 - merged with Marston 1898
John Bell & Co. pre 1880 - bought by Thomas Salt 1901
Henry Boddington & Co. existing Manchester brewer -  bought by Everard 1892
James Eadie 1854 - Bought by Bass 1933
Thomas Sykes 1881- taken over by Everard 1898
William Everard existing Leicester brewer 1892-1985 
Marston and Thompson 1898- merged with Evershed to form Marston Thompson Evershed 1909
Marston Thompson Evershed 1909-1999 bought by Wolverhampton & Dudley Breweries PLC The Marston's Brewery also produces Bass under licence from InBev
Coors Brewers Limited - Bought from InBev in 2000. UK arm of Molson Coors Brewing Company a brewery from the United States
 Burton Bridge Brewery, microbrewery
 Tower Brewery, microbrewery
 Cottage Brewery, based in the Old Cottage Inn

Other brewers existing in 1880 included:

Bindley & Co
Bowler Bros
Carter Victoria Brewery
Clayton & Co
Cliff & Co
Cooper & Co
Edwin Dawson & Co
Richard A. Eddie
Green & Clarkson.
Frederick Heap
Frederick C Hill
Pegge & Co
James Porter & Sons
Robinson & Co
A.B. Walker & Co.

A further three brewers are listed in 1898:

Beard Hill & Co
Burton & Lincoln Brewery
Trent Brewery Co

Political influence

When the town was incorporated as a borough in 1878, the brewers Henry Wardle, John Yeomans, and Sydney Evershed were chosen as aldermen at the first council meeting; other brewers were co-opted, and William Henry Worthington chosen as mayor. Brewers were prominent in Parliament, with Bass, Ratcliff, Gretton and Evershed representing Burton, and Gretton and Wardle representing South Derbyshire. Many brewers were ennobled, including Allsopp, Bass and Gretton, creating a subgroup of the peerage nicknamed the Beerage. Yet an industry that had over 30 participants in 1881 had declined to eight in 1927 and many famous names disappeared from the shelves.

Brewers and cricket

In 1827, Burton Cricket Club was formed through the influence of Abraham Bass, son of brewer Michael Bass. Bass was known as the father of Midland cricket and was a member of the Northern Counties team which played against the M.C.C. at Burton in 1841. In the heyday of brewing in Burton, many brewery companies had their own cricket teams. The Brewery Cup was established around 1894 by the Burton Breweries Cricket Association. A legacy of the era remains in the two cricket grounds that have been used by Derbyshire County Cricket Club - the Bass Worthington Ground and the Ind Coope Ground. First class cricketers from the brewing families, all of whom except the Allsopps played for Derbyshire, include:

Frederic Allsopp
Herbert Allsopp
John Eadie
William Eadie
Edward Evershed 
Frank Evershed
Sydney Evershed
Wallis Evershed  
William Evershed 
Robert George Tomlinson
William Tomlinson

References

Beer in England
Burton upon Trent
Breweries in England